Governor Livingston High School is a comprehensive four-year co-educational public high school serving students in ninth through twelfth grades, located in Berkeley Heights, in Union County, New Jersey, United States, and operating as the lone secondary school of the Berkeley Heights Public Schools. The school has been accredited by the Middle States Association of Colleges and Schools Commission on Elementary and Secondary Schools since 1965.

Governor Livingston provides programs for deaf, hard of hearing and cognitively-impaired students in the district and those who are enrolled from all over north-central New Jersey who attend on a tuition basis.

As of the 2021–22 school year, the school had an enrollment of 950 students and 89.4 classroom teachers (on an FTE basis), for a student–teacher ratio of 10.6:1. There were 18 students (1.9% of enrollment) eligible for free lunch and 3 (0.3% of students) eligible for reduced-cost lunch.

Of the members of the 2012 graduating class, 87% planned to attend four-year colleges and another 7% to go to two-year colleges.

History
Union County Regional High School District was established in 1937, as the first regional high school district in New Jersey, for the students from the municipalities of Berkeley Heights, Clark, Garwood, Kenilworth, Mountainside, and Springfield. At that time, all students residing in the district attended Jonathan Dayton High School in Springfield. As the district began to grow, additional schools were built, and, in September 1960, Governor Livingston Regional High School opened its doors to 800 students from Berkeley Heights and Mountainside. Designed to accommodate an enrollment of 900, projected increases in the numbers of students lead the district to consider a $1.5 million expansion to add capacity for an additional 600 students before the school had even opened. The regional district's superintendent at the time was Dr. Warren Davis and Frederick Aho was the first principal of the high school. The school was built adjacent to an active Nike Missile Control Station in the Murray Hill section of Berkeley Heights.

The "Highlander" was chosen the school's mascot by student body vote in 1960, combining the tradition of the town's first baseball team and the location of the school at the highest point in Union County.  William Livingston, for whom the school is named, was of Scottish Highland descent. In 1960, the yearbook adopted the name Claymore, which has continued to the present day.

Project Graduation, held the night of graduation and run entirely by volunteers, debuted in 1989, and provides a safe all-night celebration of each graduating class.

In May 1996, the vote to de-regionalize the school district passed and the incoming freshmen in the fall of 1997 were the first to enter Governor Livingston High School, part of the Berkeley Heights School District.

The high school's namesake is William Livingston, the first Governor of New Jersey and a signatory of the United States Constitution. The Royal Stewart tartan of the Stewart Clan (of whom Livingston was a member) is a symbol of the school and the tartan's red and blue colors are the high school's colors.

It is the sole secondary school for students from Berkeley Heights, along with approximately 300 students from neighboring Borough of Mountainside who are educated at the high school as part of a sending/receiving relationship with the Mountainside School District that is covered by an agreement that runs through the end of 2021–22 school year.

School principals

Awards, recognition and rankings
In its 2013 report on "America's Best High Schools", The Daily Beast ranked the school 416th in the nation among participating public high schools and 35th among schools in New Jersey. In the 2011 "Ranking America's High Schools" issue by The Washington Post, the school was ranked 32nd in New Jersey and 1,112th nationwide. The school was ranked 416th in Newsweek's 2009 ranking of the top 1,500 high schools in the United States and was ranked 8th in New Jersey, with 2.293 AP tests taken in 2008 per graduating senior and 48% of all graduating seniors passing at least one AP exam; The school was ranked 707th nationwide in 2008. In Newsweek's 2007 rankings of the country's top 1,200 high schools, Governor Livingston High School was listed in 776th place, the 17th-highest ranked school in New Jersey. With the rankings calculated by Jay Mathews shifted to The Washington Post in 2011, the school was ranked 31st in New Jersey and 1,071st nationwide.

The school was the 36th-ranked public high school in New Jersey out of 339 schools statewide in New Jersey Monthly magazine's September 2014 cover story on the state's "Top Public High Schools", using a new ranking methodology. The school had also been ranked 36th in the state of 328 schools in 2012, after being ranked 24th in 2010 out of 322 schools listed. The magazine ranked the school 15th in 2008 out of 316 schools. The school was ranked 21st in the magazine's September 2006 issue, which included 316 schools across the state. Schooldigger.com ranked the school 26th out of 381 public high schools statewide in its 2011 rankings (an increase of 48 positions from the 2010 ranking) which were based on the combined percentage of students classified as proficient or above proficient on the mathematics (95.4%) and language arts literacy (98.4%) components of the High School Proficiency Assessment (HSPA).

In its listing of "America's Best High Schools 2016", Governor Livingston was ranked 192nd out of 500 best high schools in the country; it was ranked 30th among all high schools in New Jersey and 14th among non-magnet schools.

Academics
Governor Livingston's academic program has been very highly rated, with the high school finishing in the top 40 secondary schools in New Jersey in a recent survey.  The school offers a wide variety of classes including Advanced Placement (AP) courses for college credit.

The school has offers a wide variety of courses. There is a language requirement, in which a student must take at least two years of a non-English language. It is highly recommended to take four years of a single language.  Languages Offered: Spanish, French, Italian, Latin, and American Sign Language.

Governor Livingston was the winner of the 1994, 1995, and 1996 New Jersey Science Olympiad Division C Championship, 1997 Division 5 National Champions for the Junior Engineering Technical Society's TEAMS competition and winners of the 1997 New Jersey State Science Bowl.

Deaf and Hard of Hearing Program
Governor Livingston has an extensive Deaf and Hard of Hearing program for students around Union County. The school's American Sign Language (ASL) and Junior National Association for the Deaf (JrNAD) clubs promote the cultural aspects of deafness that support a strong deaf peer group.

This program offers the following services to students who are deaf and hard of hearing:

 Self-contained, resource center, general education classes on all academic levels.
 Elective classes in a wide variety of subject areas.
 Shared program available with Union County Vocational Technical School.
 Teachers of the Deaf who instruct using Total Communication (voice and sign).
 Educational interpreters on staff.
 A speech and language specialist who is responsible for enhancing communication skills.  The program includes two sessions per week.
 Clubs, sports and after school activities in an inclusive setting.
 Support for students with cochlear implants.
 Interpreters are available for non-curricular activities including guidance appointments, assemblies and GLHS theatrical performances.

The JrNAD (Junior National Association for the Deaf) is a club consisting of deaf, hard of hearing and hearing students, that promotes leadership, socialization and community service.  Under the guidance of the advisors, students not only plan trips and social events, but also engage in fundraising activities to benefit causes outside the organization.  Past trips have included interpreted Broadway performances and special D/HH events across New Jersey.

American Sign Language is offered as a language, and students enrolled in ASL classes have the opportunity to interact with the deaf and hard of hearing students which enables the students to both practice and enhance their signing skills.

Athletics
The Governor Livingston High School Highlanders compete in the Union County Interscholastic Athletic Conference, which is comprised of public and private high schools in Union County and was established following a reorganization of sports leagues in Northern New Jersey by the New Jersey State Interscholastic Athletic Association (NJSIAA). Before the NJSIAA's 2009 realignment, the school had competed in the Mountain Valley Conference, which included high schools in Essex County and Union County. With 747 students in grades 10–12, the school was classified by the NJSIAA for the 2019–20 school year as Group II for most athletic competition purposes, which included schools with an enrollment of 486 to 758 students in that grade range. The football team competes in Division 2A of the Big Central Football Conference, which includes 60 public and private high schools in Hunterdon, Middlesex, Somerset, Union and Warren counties, which are broken down into 10 divisions by size and location. The school was classified by the NJSIAA as Group III North for football for 2018–2020.

School colors are navy and scarlet. The school fields teams in varsity, junior varsity, and freshman football, boys and girls soccer, cross country, cheerleading, wrestling, basketball, indoor and outdoor track, baseball, softball, golf, swimming, tennis, field hockey, bowling, lacrosse, fencing and ice hockey. In 2006, the school finished installing a FieldTurf on its football field. It is used primarily for football, soccer, lacrosse and field hockey.

The school participates as the host school / lead agency for a joint ice hockey team with New Providence High School. The co-op program operates under agreements scheduled to expire at the end of the 2023–24 school year.

In 1965, the Governor Livingston Regional High School football team, coached by Jack Bicknell, was awarded by the NJSIAA with the school's first state championship, a North Jersey Group II title (as co-champion with Millburn High School), for a team that was undefeated, untied and nearly unscored on. In 2008, the football team qualified for the playoffs and reached the state sectional final, where it lost to James Caldwell High School at Giants Stadium by a score of 22–7.

The boys' varsity soccer team won the Group II title in 1977 (defeating Lawrence High School in the finals), 1979 (vs. Freehold High School), 1984 (vs. Freehold) and 1994 (vs. Hopewell Valley Central High School). In 1977, the team finished the season with a 15-6-1 record after winning the Group II title, the school's first state championship, defeating Lawrence High School in overtime at Mercer County Park by a score of 3–2. The team won the Group II title for a second time in 1979, with a 3–2 defeat of Freehold Borough in the finals. In 1984, the team won the Group II state championship against Freehold Borough and was ranked by The Star-Ledger as high as number 4 in the state. In 1994, the Highlanders boys' soccer team won Mountain Valley Conference, Union County and the New Jersey Group II state championships with a 2–0 win over Hopewell Valley.

The wrestling team won the North II Group II state sectional title in 1980 and 1981. In 1993, Ricky Ortega won the state championship in wrestling at 130 lbs.

The girls soccer team has won the Group II title in 1985 (defeating runner-up Delran High School in the tournament final) and 2018 (vs. Ramsey High School). In 1985, the Highlander girls' varsity soccer team finished the season 19-1-1 after winning the school's first girls' state championship, taking the Group II title with a 1–0 victory against Delran. In 2018, the team ended the season 21-4 after having won the Group II state championship with a 3–2 win against Ramsey in the finals of the playoffs.

The Highlander baseball team won the Group II state championship in 1999 (defeating runner-up Gateway Regional High School in the finals of the tournament), 2011 (vs. West Essex High School) and 2015 (vs. Bernards High School). The program won its second Group II state title in 2011 with a win in the finals against the West Essex High School Knights by a score of 8–2. In 2015, the team won its third Group II state championship with a 10–4 win in the tournament final against Bernards High School. In 2016, the baseball team captured their first ever Union County Tournament championship with a 3–2 win against Scotch Plains-Fanwood High School.

In 2004, Mike Carmody won the state championship in the 800m.

In 2005, Anthony Abitante won the state championship in the pole vault.

The softball team won the 2007 Central, Group II state sectional championship with a string of shutout wins over Roselle Park High School (10-0), Shore Regional High School (6-0) and Delaware Valley Regional High School (1-0) in the tournament final. The team moved on to win the Group II state championship with wins over James Caldwell High School (4-2) and Pascack Hills High School (2-0) in the final game of the playoffs.

In 2007, the women's field hockey team made the state playoffs for the first time in 30 years. The 2007 record was the best it had been in the past decade.

In 2008, the boys fencing team won the state title in the sabre; in 2015 the team won the foil team title. In 2009, the girls squad won the overall team title and the sabre title; in 2012, the team won the foil state title.

The 2008-09 ice hockey team qualified for the 2009 UCIHL playoffs and finished second in the county.  The team also qualified for the New Jersey Public High School state championship and went on to the school's first state playoff victory over Sparta High School with a score of 1–0.

In 2011, Anthony DeFranco was the North II Group II pole vault state champ as well as a 1st Team All-State track and field selection by the Star Ledger. and the track team won their fourth state sectional championship in the previous seven years.

In 2013, the boys track team won their fifth state sectional championship.

The boys track team won the Group II spring track state championship in 2017.

Marching band
The Governor Livingston Highlander Band was under the direction of Dan Kopcha since the early 1970s.  In 2007 Kopcha announced his retirement and the band has subsequently been under the direction of Nicholas O'Sullivan, himself a Governor Livingston alumnus and former Highlander Band member. The band is extremely competitive and has been recognized with many awards.  One of the earliest competitive wins was the 1972 award of the Governor's Cup at the Festival of States in St. Petersburg, Florida.  The band competes against other bands associated with an organization called Tournament of Bands (TOB). TOB is organized into regions called "chapters", with the Highlander Band being in Chapter X. The championship competition is known as the Atlantic Coast Championship held each November. The Highlander Band has won many awards in TOB such as 28 chapter championships. Every four years, most recently in 2018, the band travels to Scotland to perform in Ancrum, Stirling and Edinburgh.

The Governor Livingston Highlander Band is the winner of thirteen Tournament of Bands Atlantic Coast Championships: 1980, 1988, 1989, 1990, 1991, 1992, 1993, 1997, 2005, 2006, 2008, 2011 and 2012 (1980 Group 4, 1993 Group 2, others Group 1). Governor Livingston is also the winner of eight USSBA (Formally CMBC and currently US Bands) Championships: 1988, 1989, 1990, 1991, 1992, 1993, 1997 (1993 and 1997 Group 2-Open, others Group 1-Open), and the Yamaha Cup in 2008 with the award for Military Pride.

As part of the marching band, students attending GLHS have the opportunity to join the GLHS Highlander Pipe Band where they perform at various community events and lead the marching band through parades.

Clubs
The school has many clubs including foreign language clubs, drama, and various student outreach programs:

 Art Club
 Athletic Honor Society
 The Claymore
 Drama Club
 Environmental Club
 French Club/Honor Society
 Future Business Leaders of America   
 Highlander Band
 Highlander Newspaper
 Interact
 Italian Club/Honor Society
 Junior State of America
 Latin Club/Honor Society
 Link Crew
 Math League Team
 Mu Alpha Theta 
 National Honor Society
 National Art Honor Society
 Pipe Band 
 Quill and Scroll
 Science Team
 Sign Language & Jr. NAD Club
 Spanish Club
 Spanish Honor Society
 Student Council
 Student Auxiliary
 Turning Recreational Events in New Directions

 
Informal clubs and activities
The following clubs and activities are volunteer based. As a result, it is not guaranteed that the club is currently active.

 Anime Club
 Astronomy Club
 GLTV Crew
 Guitar Club
 Hi-Los
 Literary Lunch
 Model UN
 Mobile Applications Club
 Pep Club
 Programming Club
 Sports Business Club
 Student Ambassadors
 Writing Club
 Understanding Asian Cultures Club

GLTV
The Berkeley Heights local access cable channel (GLTV) Comcast: 34 / FiOS: 47 broadcasts from the Governor Livingston Television Studio; the station is run almost entirely by students with the help of a single adult advisor.  The students, referred to as the GLTV Crew, shoot various events in the school such as sports, concerts, plays and events.  Many shows are available on the station's website.

Student government
The student government consists of a President, Vice President, Secretary, Treasurer, and representatives from each class. An executive board is elected from the senior class, again with titles of President, Vice President, Secretary, and Treasurer. The Student Council works to make changes in student policy and plan special events.

Administration
The school's principal is Robert Nixon. His administration team includes the two assistant principals and the athletic director.

Notable alumni
 Dennis Boutsikaris (born 1952), actor.
 Scott M. Gimple (class of 1989), television and comic book writer.
 Jerry Ragonese (born 1986), professional lacrosse player for the Redwoods Lacrosse Club of The Premier Lacrosse League.
 Juliette Reilly (born 1993), singer-songwriter and YouTuber.
 Peter Sagal (born 1965, class of 1983), playwright and host of NPR's Wait Wait... Don't Tell Me!.
 Jill Santoriello (class of 1983), Broadway playwright and composer, musical A Tale of Two Cities.

References

External links

School Profile
Berkeley Heights Public Schools

School Data for the Berkeley Heights Public Schools, National Center for Education Statistics
Governor Livingston Highlander Band website

Berkeley Heights, New Jersey
Mountainside, New Jersey
1960 establishments in New Jersey
Educational institutions established in 1960
Public high schools in Union County, New Jersey